The PTT Bangkok Open was a women's tennis tournament held in Bangkok, Thailand. Held from 2005 to 2007, this WTA Tour event was a Tier III-tournament and was played on outdoor hardcourts.

Finals

Singles

Doubles

See also
 Bangkok Tennis Classic – men's tournament
 List of tennis tournaments

External links
Official website

 
2005 establishments in Thailand
2007 disestablishments in Thailand
Tennis
Tennis
WTA Tour
Hard court tennis tournaments
October sporting events
Recurring sporting events established in 2005
Recurring events disestablished in 2007
Tennis
Tennis in Bangkok
Tennis tournaments in Thailand
Defunct tennis tournaments in Thailand